John Casey Taylor  (2 December 193014 May 2011) was a senior Australian public servant. He was Secretary of the Department of Aboriginal Affairs from 1981 to 1984.

Life and career
John Taylor was born on 2 December 1930 in Melbourne. He graduated from University of Melbourne with a degree in commerce.

Taylor joined the Australian Public Service in 1952 as a clerk in the Victorian branch of the Postmaster-General's Department.

Between 1974 and 1981, Taylor was a Commissioner on the Public Service Board.

In 1981 he was appointed Secretary of the Department of Aboriginal Affairs. According to Charles Perkins, who succeeded him as Secretary in the department, his departure in 1984 was against his wishes. He was made a special adviser to the Department until June 1984, when he was appointed Australia's Consul-General in New York.

Between 1988 and 1995 he was Commonwealth Auditor-General. As Auditor-General, Taylor said he saw his main achievements as providing a much more efficient and focused service to the Australian Parliament and people, and keeping up with (if not getting ahead of) contemporary professional standards.

Taylor died on 14 May 2011.

Awards
In 1990, Taylor was made an Officer of the Order of Australia for his public service.

References

Further reading

1930 births
2011 deaths
Australian public servants
Officers of the Order of Australia
University of Melbourne alumni
Consuls-General of Australia in New York
Australian National University alumni